The Daily Review was a daily newspaper published in Hayward, California. Floyd L. Sparks was owner of the Review from 1944 to 1985, along with The Argus of Fremont and the Tri-Valley Herald. It was last owned by Bay Area News Group-East Bay (BANG-EB), a subsidiary of MediaNews Group, which bought the paper in 1985. As of 2011, the executive editor was Kevin Keane.

Proposed end of publication
The newspaper was scheduled to stop publishing, with the last edition of the paper to be published on November 1, 2011. This was on the same day as the Oakland Tribune, Alameda Times-Star, Fremont Argus and West County Times were all scheduled to publish their last editions. The following day, subscribers and newspaper outlets were to get copies of the new East Bay Tribune, a proposed localized edition of the San Jose Mercury News, covering the areas previously served by the above-mentioned papers. This plan, proposed by ANG in mid 2011, was cancelled in October 2011, due to reader feedback.

End of publication
In 2016, the paper was shuttered, when BANG merged numerous East Bay papers into the East Bay Times.

References

External links
 Official site

Daily newspapers published in the San Francisco Bay Area
Mass media in Alameda County, California
Companies based in Hayward, California
MediaNews Group publications